Dianic Wicca, also known as Dianic Witchcraft, is a modern pagan goddess tradition focused on female experience and empowerment. Leadership is by women, who may be ordained as priestesses, or in less formal groups that function as collectives. While some adherents identify as Wiccan, it differs from most traditions of Wicca in that only goddesses are honored (whereas most Wiccan traditions honor both female and male deities).

While there is more than one tradition known as Dianic, the most widely known is the female-only variety, with the most prominent tradition thereof founded by Zsuzsanna Budapest in the United States in the 1970s. It is notable for its worship of a single, monotheistic Great Goddess (with all other goddesses - of all cultures worldwide - seen as "aspects" of this goddess) and a focus on egalitarian matriarchy. While the tradition is named after the Roman goddess Diana, Dianics worship goddesses from many cultures, within the Dianic Wiccan ritual framework.  Diana, (considered correlate to the Greek Artemis) "is seen as representing a central mythic theme of woman-identified cosmology. She is the protector of women and of the wild, untamed spirit of nature." 

The Dianic Wiccan belief and ritual structure is an eclectic combination of elements from British Traditional Wicca, Italian folk-magic as recorded by Charles Leland in Aradia, New Age beliefs, and folk magic and healing practices from a variety of different cultures.

Beliefs and practices
Dianic Wiccans of the Budapest lineage worship the Goddess, who they see as containing all goddesses, from all cultures; she is seen as the source of all living things and containing all that is within her. 

Dianic covens practice magic in the form of meditation and visualization in addition to spell work. They focus especially on healing themselves from the wounds of the patriarchy while affirming their own womanhood.

Rituals can include reenacting religious and spiritual lore from a female-centered standpoint, celebrating the female body, and mourning society's abuses of women. The practice of magic is rooted in the belief that energy or 'life force' can be directed to enact change. However it is important to note that rituals are often improvised to suit individual or group needs and vary from coven to coven. Some Dianic Wiccans eschew manipulative spellwork and hexing because it goes against the Wiccan Rede. However, many other Dianic witches (notably Budapest) do not consider hexing or binding of those who attack women to be wrong, and actively encourage the binding of rapists.

Differences from mainstream Wicca

Like other Wiccans, Dianics may form covens, attend festivals, celebrate the eight major Wiccan holidays, and gather on Esbats. They use many of the same altar tools, rituals, and vocabulary as other Wiccans. Dianics may also gather in less formal Circles. The most noticeable difference between the two are that Dianic covens of Budapest lineage are composed entirely of women. Central to feminist Dianic focus and practice are embodied Women's Mysteries - the celebrations and honoring of the female life cycle and its correspondences to the Earth's seasonal cycle, healing from internalized oppression, female sovereignty and agency. Another marked difference in cosmology from other Wiccan traditions is rejecting the concept of duality based in gender stereotypes. 

When asked why "men and gods" are excluded from her rituals, Budapest stated:

Sociological studies have shown that there is therapeutic value inherent in Dianic ritual. Healing rituals to overcome personal trauma and raise awareness about violence against women have earned comparisons to the female-centered consciousness-raising groups of the 1960s and 70s. Some Dianic groups develop rituals specifically to confront gendered personal trauma, such as battery, rape, incest, and partner abuse. In one ethnographic study of such a ritual, women shifted their understanding of power from the hands of their abusers to themselves. It was found that this ritual had improved self-perception in participants in the short-term, and that the results could be sustained with ongoing practice. 
 
Dianic Wicca developed from the Women's Liberation Movement and some covens traditionally compare themselves with radical feminism. Dianics pride themselves on the inclusion of lesbian and bisexual members in their groups and leadership. It is a goal within many covens to explore female sexuality and sensuality outside of male control, and many rituals function to affirm lesbian sexuality, making it a popular tradition for lesbians and bisexuals. Some covens exclusively consist of same-sex oriented women and advocate lesbian separatism. Ruth Barrett writes,

History
Aradia, or the Gospel of the Witches claims that ancient Diana, Aphrodite, Aradia, and Herodias cults linked to the Sacred Mysteries are the origin of the all-female coven and many witch myths as we know them.

Z Budapest's branch of Dianic Wicca began on the Winter Solstice of 1971, when Budapest led a ceremony in Hollywood, California. Self-identifying as a "hereditary witch," and claiming to have learned folk magic from her mother, Budapest is frequently considered the mother of modern Dianic Wiccan tradition. Dianic Wicca itself is named after the Roman goddess of the same name.
Ruth Rhiannon Barrett was ordained by Z Budpest in 1980 and inherited Budapest's Los Angeles ministry. This community continues through Circle of Aradia, a grove of Temple of Diana, Inc.

Denominations and related traditions

 Traditions derived from Zsuzsanna Budapest - Female-only covens run by priestesses trained and initiated by Budapest.
 Independent Dianic witches - who may have been inspired by Budapest, her published work (such as The Holy Book of Women's Mysteries) or other woman's spirituality movements, and who emphasize independent study and self-initiation.

McFarland Dianic
McFarland Dianic is a Neopagan tradition of goddess worship founded by Morgan McFarland and Mark Roberts which, despite the shared name, has a different theology and structure than the women-only groups. In most cases, the McFarland Dianics accept male participants. McFarland largely bases their tradition on the work of Robert Graves and his book The White Goddess. While some McFarland covens will initiate men, the leadership is limited to female priestesses. Like the women-only Dianic traditions, "McFarland Dianic covens espouse feminism as an all-important concept." They consider the decision whether to include or exclude males as "solely the choice of [a member coven's] individual High Priestess."

Critcism for transphobia
Dianic Wicca has been criticised by many in the Neopagan community for being transphobic. In February 2011, Zsuzsanna Budapest conducted a ritual with the Circle of Cerridwen at PantheaCon for "genetic women only" from which she barred trans women as well men. This caused a backlash that led many to criticize Dianic Wicca as an inherently transphobic lesbian-separatist movement. The Los Angeles Times wrote that:

See also

References

Works cited

Further reading 
 Barrett, Ruth. Women's Rites, Women's Mysteries: Intuitive Ritual Creation. Llewellyn Publications; 2007, . Earlier publishing: Women's Rites, Women's Mysteries: Creating Ritual in the Dianic Wiccan Tradition. Authorhouse; 2004, .
 Eisler, Riane, The Chalice and the Blade.
 Mountainwater, Shekhinah, Ariadne's Thread.
 Ochshorn, Judith and Cole, Ellen. Women's Spirituality, Women's Lives. Haworth Press 1995. . pp 122 & 133 referring to Z Budapest and Shekinah Mountainwater, among others, in a discussion of Dianic Witchcraft.
 Pond, Gina, et al. Gender and Transgender in Modern Paganism. Circle of Cerridwen Press, 2012. 
 On Starhawk, the Reclaiming Tradition and feminism, M. Macha NightMare .
 Interview with Starhawk in Modern Pagans: An Investigation of Contemporary Pagan Practices, ed. V. Vale and John Sulak, Re/Search, San Francisco, 2001, .

External links
Dianic Wicca, Official Website
Dianic Tradition, Official Website
Dianic Wicca, Website
Z. Budapest
International Goddess Conference
Susan B. Anthony Coven, Dianic Wicca Website
Temple of Diana
The McFarland Dianic Tradition

 
Monotheistic religions
Feminist spirituality
Modern paganism in the United States
Wiccan feminism
Diana (mythology)
1970s in modern paganism